Rhys Cadman (born 24 September 1998) is an English actor, best known for his work on Channel 4 comedy drama series Shameless as Tam Blanco and on ITV soap opera Coronation Street as Jackson Hodge.

Filmography

References

External links

21st-century English male actors
Male actors from Oldham
1998 births
Living people
English LGBT actors
English male soap opera actors
LGBT male actors